Terpsithea (Τερψιθέα) is the northernmost settlement of the municipality of Glyfada in Athens, Greece. It lies on foot of the mountain Ymittos and has an altitude between 120 and 180 m. The name comes from the Greek words Terpsi+thea (Τέρψη+θέα) and means pleasure, fun, gaze.

Climate

There is at least one automated meteorological station in Terpsithea that gives the following averages (1995-2006):

External links
 Live weather data from a weather station in Terpsithea, Glyfada

Populated places in South Athens (regional unit)
Glyfada

el:Γλυφάδα#Τερψιθέα